Creative Voice , filename extension .voc, is an audio format for digital audio data developed in the 1990s Sound Blaster sound cards from Creative Technology.

Construction

Original 8-bit format 
The file format  consists of a 26-byte header and a series of subsequent data blocks containing the audio information. The byte order is little-endian.

The header is followed by data blocks. Each data block begins with a type byte describing the contents of the data, followed by 3 bytes for the size of the data. For two of the 9 defined types, the subsequent size of the data is missing, so the block ultimately consists of only a single byte – these are 0x00 terminator, and 0x07 repeat end.

If a size is specified, the first 4 bytes will be followed by a block of the content resulting from the specified type with the specified size.

The file optionally ends with the terminator block (data block of type 0x00).

Use
Creative Voice files were used in various DOS games when they could use sound blaster cards for audio output, such as Eye of the Beholder.

The spread of the file format disappeared noticeably with the advent of RIFF WAVE, which was already supported in Windows. However, the Creative Voice file format required the installation of additional player programs included with the Sound Blaster Card drivers. With the advent of AC'97, WAVE, file extension .WAV, finally prevailed.

References

Audio file formats